Starting on September 21, 2022, and progressing into 2023, an earthquake swarm occurred in the Iranian province of West Azerbaijan, close to the city of Khoy near the Turkish border. Due to these three events, a total of 3,508 buildings were destroyed and 38,723 others were damaged in Khoy, including nearly 1,000 schools. Three people died and over 3,000 people were injured, almost all of them due to panic and only a few from collapsed houses.

Tectonic setting
Iran lies within the complicated zone of continental collision between the Arabian and Eurasian Plates, which extends from the Zagros fold and thrust belt in the south to the Caucasus mountains and the Kopet Dag mountains to the north. In northwestern Iran, the Arabian Plate is moving at about 20 mm per year relative to the Eurasian Plate. Deformation near the city of Tabriz is dominated by the North Tabriz Fault, a WNW-ESE trending right-lateral strike-slip fault, which has been responsible for seven major earthquakes of magnitude 6 or higher since 858 AD. Other known active faults include a W-E trending fault between the cities of Ahar and Heris.  This same setting was responsible for a magnitude 6.4 earthquake in August 2012, killing at least 38 and injuring more than 3,200, 268 of which died later in hospitals. In February 2020, two earthquakes caused ten deaths and many injuries in both countries.

Earthquake sequence
The earthquakes occurred near the city of Khoy, and started with a magnitude 5.1 foreshock on September 21. On January 18, 2023, a magnitude 5.7 earthquake struck about 4 km to the southwest. Ten days later, an earthquake with a magnitude of 5.9, struck 2 km to the southwest. The mainshock was also felt in Turkey, Azerbaijan, and Armenia.

Impact

2022 event
At least 1,127 people were injured, of whom 135 required treatment. Over 1,100 houses were completely destroyed and around 10,000 others were damaged in Khoy. However, only one injury was caused by falling debris. In total, two provinces, two cites and 53 villages were affected by the earthquake.

2023 events

January 18
An additional 252 people received panic-induced injuries. At least 4,420 houses were damaged, of which 570 collapsed or were uninhabitable,  and 3,850 others received minor to moderate damage.

January 28
Damage more severe than the previous two events occurred, as well as some power outages. The earthquake killed three people. An additional 1,750 were injured, including at least seven in Salmas and three in Chaypareh. Between 20 and 50 percent of houses in 70 villages near the epicentre, as well as over 1,750 others in Khoy collapsed, while 7,500 houses received moderate damage and 16,500 others with slight damage. At least 88 schools were also destroyed and 873 others were damaged.

See also

 List of earthquakes in 2022
 List of earthquakes in 2023
 List of earthquakes in Iran
 1930 Salmas earthquake

Notes

References

2022 earthquakes
2023 earthquakes
2022 disasters in Iran
2023 disasters in Iran
October 2022 events in Iran
January 2023 events in Iran
Earthquakes in Iran
2022-2023 earthquakes